Bastani, locally known as  ( "traditional ice cream") or  ( "traditional saffron ice cream"), is an Iranian ice cream made from milk, eggs, sugar, rose water, saffron, vanilla, and pistachios. It is known widely as Persian ice cream. Bastani often contains flakes of frozen clotted cream. Sometimes, salep is included as an ingredient.

Āb havij bastani is an ice cream float using carrot juice and occasionally, may be garnished with cinnamon, nutmeg, or other spices.

History

The history of bastani probably began around 500 BCE in the Achaemenid Empire of Persia. Various syrups would be poured over snow to produce summertime treats called "fruit ice" (sharbat). Typically, the ice was mixed with saffron, grape juices, fruits, and other flavours. The Macedonian leader Alexander the Great, who battled the Persians for ten years, enjoyed "fruit ices" sweetened with honey and chilled with snow.

In 400 BCE, the Persians also invented a sorbet made with rose water and vermicelli called faloodeh. Persians introduced ice cream and faloodeh to Arabs after the Arab invasion of Iran and the fall of Persian Sasanian Empire.

See also
 Pistachio ice cream
 Faloodeh
 Kulfi
 Spumoni

References

Iranian desserts
Ice cream